The British-Soviet Friendship Society was a British organisation active from 1946 to 1991.
 
The society's papers are held at the Marx Memorial Library, while the University of Hull's archives hold papers relating to the society's 1952 trip to the Soviet Union.

The society was a successor to the Friends of the Soviet Union (established in 1930), the Russia Today Society (1934), and the Anglo-Soviet Friendship Committee (1940).

From 1956 to 1990, it published a monthly or bimonthly journal British-Soviet Friendship, retitled BSFS Journal in 1990.

References

Defunct political organisations based in the United Kingdom
Soviet Union friendship associations
Soviet Union–United Kingdom relations